Yes International! is a Nigerian daily soft sell magazine that specializes in celebrity news and human-interest stories published by Azuh Arinze.

History 
Yes International! was founded by Azuh Arinze in 2011 after he exited as the editor of Encomium Magazine. In 2013, Yes International! published an interview with Genevieve Nnaji, which Nnaji called a lie, days later, Yes International! said it was an old interviewer.

References 

2012 establishments in Nigeria
English-language magazines
Lifestyle magazines
Magazines established in 2011
Magazines published in Nigeria
 Online magazines published in Nigeria